Kyle Michael Philips (born June 17, 1999) is an American football wide receiver for the Tennessee Titans of the National Football League (NFL). He played college football at UCLA and was a first-team all-conference selection in the Pac-12 in 2021.

Early years
Philips grew up in San Marcos, California, and attended San Marcos High School. As a junior, he had 65 receptions for 909 yards and eleven touchdowns. In his senior year, Philips caught 59 passes for 1,318 yards and 10 touchdowns. He also made 59 tackles on defense in his high school career.

Philips was ranked as a four-star recruit by ESPN and listed as the No. 31 recruit in California. He was recruited by Jimmie Dougherty, who was the receivers coach for UCLA at the time. He signed his National Letter of Intent on December 20, 2017, becoming the first official signing for their new head coach, Chip Kelly.

College career
As a freshman at the University of California, Los Angeles, Philips played in three of the first four games of the 2018 season before suffering a concussion and opting to redshirt. He led the team in 2019 with 60 catches, 681 receiving yards and five touchdown receptions.

In 2021, he was named to the preseason watch list for the Paul Hornung Award, awarded to the most versatile player in the nation. He also received preseason All-Pac-12 first-team honors. Philips had seven catches for 113 yards, including scores of 42 and 15 yards, in a loss to Fresno State. The two touchdown catches tied his career high with the other occurring in 2019 against the Stanford Cardinal. At the game against Colorado on November 13, 2021, Philips caught a team-high eight passes and returned a punt 82 yards for a touchdown, his second career punt return for a score  For the season, he was named first-team All-Pac-12 as a receiver and garnered second-team honors as a return specialist. Philips led the conference with 10 receiving touchdowns and was second in receiving yards per game with 67.2. He also averaged 22.6 yards per punt return, which led the conference among players with more than one return.

After the season, Philips declared for the 2022 NFL Draft. He ended his career ranked fourth in UCLA history with 163 career receptions.

Statistics

Professional career

Philips was drafted by the Tennessee Titans in the fifth round, 163rd overall, in the 2022 NFL Draft. In the 2022 season opener against the New York Giants, he led all Titans receivers with six receptions for 66 yards. He also had a 46-yard punt return to setup Tennessee's first touchdown. However, he also lost a fumble on a return.  In Week 2, he lost another fumble on a punt return against the Buffalo Bills. Philips later suffered a hamstring injury in practice and was placed on injured reserve on October 25, 2022.

References

External links
 Tennessee Titans bio
UCLA Bruins bio

1999 births
Living people
People from San Marcos, California
Sportspeople from San Diego County, California
Players of American football from California
American football wide receivers
UCLA Bruins football players
Tennessee Titans players